Corylus yunnanensis, the Yunnan hazel, is a species of hazelnut found in western China. It is a small tree or shrub. The flowers have triangular shaped petals. The round nuts which are encased in a very tough oval shaped shell and can be consumed by humans. The plant is not commercially grown for the nuts, rather they are sometimes used as ornamental plants. They are located in Western Guizhou, Hubei, South Western and Western Sichuan, and Western Yunnan.

References

External links

 Corylus yunnanensis info

yunnanensis
Endemic flora of China
Trees of China
Plants described in 1899